Higashiōsaka, Osaka held an election for the city assembly on September 23, 2007. The right-wing parties Liberal Democratic Party of Japan and New Komeito won a majority. The Japanese Communist Party emerged as the biggest opposition party.

Issues 

The major issue was the no-confidence vote towards mayor Junzō Nagao, a member of the Japanese Communist Party. Submitted shortly before the election it will force a mayoral election on October 23.

Results 

The results showed an increase of the vote for the Japanese Communist Party with almost 10,000 votes since last election and all nine candidates was elected. The LDP lost two seats, as did the New Komeito.

|-
! style="background-color:#E9E9E9;text-align:left;" |Parties
! style="background-color:#E9E9E9;text-align:right;" |Votes
! style="background-color:#E9E9E9;text-align:right;" |%
! style="background-color:#E9E9E9;text-align:right;" |Seats
|-
| style="text-align:left;" |Liberal Democratic Party of Japan (自由民主党, Jiyū Minshutō)
| style="text-align:right;" | 49,979
| style="text-align:right;" | 
| style="text-align:right;" | 16
|-
| style="text-align:left;" |New Komeito Party (公明党, Kōmeitō)
| style="text-align:right;" | 44,488
| style="text-align:right;" | 
| style="text-align:right;" | 12
|-
| style="text-align:left;" |Japanese Communist Party (日本共産党, Nihon Kyōsan-tō)
| style="text-align:right;" | 40,725
| style="text-align:right;" | 
| style="text-align:right;" | 9
|-
| style="text-align:left;" |Democratic Party of Japan (民主党, Minshutō)
| style="text-align:right;" | 12,132
| style="text-align:right;" | 
| style="text-align:right;" | 4
|-
| style="text-align:left;" |New Socialist Party （新社会, Shin Shakai-tō）
| style="text-align:right;" | 2,941
| style="text-align:right;" | 
| style="text-align:right;" | 1
|-
| style="text-align:left;" | Independents
| style="text-align:right;" | 12,118
| style="text-align:right;" | 
| style="text-align:right;" | 4
|-
|style="text-align:left;background-color:#E9E9E9"|Total (turnout 45.48%)
|width="75" style="text-align:right;background-color:#E9E9E9"| 180,388
|width="30" style="text-align:right;background-color:#E9E9E9"| 100.00
|width="30" style="text-align:right;background-color:#E9E9E9"| 46
|-
| style="text-align:left;" colspan=4 |Source:
|}

References 
 Results from JanJan 
 Akahata coverage

Higashiōsaka
Local elections in Japan
2007 elections in Japan
September 2007 events in Japan